Govindgarh, the summer capital of Mahraja Rewa, is about 18 km from Rewa in Madhya Pradesh, India. The is Rewa, with an area of about 13,000 mi²,  was the largest princely state in the Bagelkhand Agency and the second largest in Central India Agency. The British political agent for Bagelkhand resided at Satna, on the East Indian railway. The Bagelkhand capital establish in Rewa under the Rewa Maharaja.Bagheli is the local language of the region.It's neighbouring towns are Manikawar, Gurh and Rewa .

Demographics
 India census, Govindgarh had a population of 9,697. Males constitute 53% of the population and females 47%.  In Govindgarh, 16% of the population is under 6 years of age. Bagheli is local language of Rewa.

Geography

It was bordered to the north by the United Provinces, to the east by Bengal and to the south by the Central Provinces. On the west, it met other princely states of Bagelkhand, namely Maihar, Nagod, Sohawal, Kothi Baghelan and Panna. The south of the state was crossed by the Bengal-Nagpur railway, (the branch between Bilaspur and Katni) which taps the Umaria coal-field.

The main waterfalls of the region are Keoti, Chachai and Bahuti. River Bichiya and Beehar merge. Khando is known for its topography and "Govindgarh Lake", prepared by Baghela Kings. The main attraction of the region is Rewa Fort, City Museum of antique items. In the center part of the city is the summer palace of Baghela. A tunnel is also there which was used as a secret path for kings between Govind Garh and Rewa.

The Department of Tourism, Government of Madhya Pradesh State has recently leased out Govind Garh Fort to a Delhi-based Company for converting into a Heritage Hotel & Resorts and developing other tourism related activities on the related lands. The Sunderja Mangoes of the Govind Garh are famous in the country.

Govindgarh is also known as `Mini Vrindavan` and a large number of temples are situated in the region. Major temples are Ram Govind Temple, Panchmukhi Temple, Chowandi Temple, Shiv Temple, Hanuman Temple. All these temples are within the vicinity of the Govind Garh Fort. It is also believed that the name Govind Garh was based on the Govind Temple now situated within the Govind Garh Fort premises.

The main crops of the region are rice, millets and wheat. More than one-third of the area was covered with forests, yielding timber and lac.

White Tiger

The first white tiger, Mohan, was captured in 1951 in the nearby jungles, was kept in this palace until his death. The magicians Siegfried & Roy are famous for breeding and training two white tigers for their performances, referring to them as "royal white tigers", the white tiger's association with the Maharaja of Rewa.

Rewa Maharaja Martand Singh first observed the male white tiger named Mohan during his visit to Govindgarh jungle at Rewa. After hunting for months, he was able to capture the first living white tiger seen in nature. With help from official veterinary experts, he unsuccessfully tried to breed the white tiger with colored female tigers. Eventually, however, he succeeded in creating a second generation of white tigers. In time, it expanded around the world.

Distance by road from other cities

 From Prayagraj by road 140 km
 From Khajraho by road 165 km
 From Satna by road 50 km
 From Bandhav Garh National Park 120 km
 From Jabalpur by road 230 km
 From Rewa by road 22 km
 From Varanasi by road 245 km
 From Semaria by road 55 km
 From Chitrakoot by road 150 km

Transport

By air

 Rewa Airport International
 Khajuraho
 Jabalpur
 Allahabad
 Varanasi (Banaras)
Nearest airport in Prayagraj, Uttar Pradesh.

By bus

Bus stand available in the city bus stand Govinddgarh.

References

 

Cities and towns in Rewa district